Ford-Wyoming Drive-In is a drive-in theater located in Dearborn, Michigan. Opened in 1950, it features five screens. The property previously had nine, leading it to be declared the largest drive-in theater in the world.

History
Clark Enterprises built the Ford-Wyoming Drive-In in 1950. The theater opened for business on May 19 of that year, with Road to Rio as its first feature. Upon opening, the drive-in had the capacity for 750 cars.

Wayne Amusements purchased the drive-in in 1981 and expanded it by continuing to add screens. At its peak, the Ford-Wyoming had nine screens and a capacity of over 3,000 cars, leading it to become the largest drive-in theater in the world.

In 2006, the owners sold the land on which the sixth through ninth screens were located. This decision was made due to a decline in population of the Detroit area. The five screens have remained operational since this downsizing. This has reduced the overall capacity to 2,500 cars. It is one of nine remaining drive-in theaters in the state of Michigan, and the only one in Metro Detroit. As of 2019, the theater is owned by Charles Shafer.

References

External links
Official website

1950 establishments in Michigan
Buildings and structures in Dearborn, Michigan
Cinemas and movie theaters in Michigan
Drive-in theaters in the United States
Tourist attractions in Detroit